Dalat International School is an international day and boarding school in Penang, Malaysia. Founded as a boarding school for children of missionaries in Southeast Asia, it has grown into an international school with a diverse student population. As of the beginning of the 2017-2018 school year, there are 650 students representing 28 different countries. It is one of eleven schools on the island and is the only one offering an American curriculum.

History 
Dalat School was founded in 1929 as a private Christian boarding school in Dalat, Vietnam to provide a North American elementary and high school education for children of Christian and Missionary Alliance (C&MA) missionaries in Indochina. In 1962, Reverend Archie E. Mitchell, who was on staff at the school with his wife Betty, was abducted by Viet Cong guerrillas. As the Vietnam War escalated, in 1965, the teachers and staff were evacuated by the USAF to Bangkok, Thailand.  During this period, the school was located in the American Club on Wireless Road, which is across the street from the US Ambassador's residence. Eight months later, the school relocated to Tanah Rata in the Cameron Highlands of Malaysia where it remained for six years.

During the late 1960’s, the school administrators looked for a new location after the conclusion of the Indonesia–Malaysia confrontation, because the British forces based in Penang were withdrawing from the peninsula. In June 1971, Dalat moved into the former British R&R facility known as "Sandycroft" along the beaches of Tanjung Bunga in Penang, Malaysia, where it has been ever since. Despite some renovations and additions to the buildings, the initial architecture and layout of the property remains largely unchanged since the school moved in.

Since 1999, Dalat has been governed by an inter-denominational school board.

Organisation 
Dalat is divided into three sections: Elementary School (PS-4), Middle School (5-8) and High School (9-12), each having its own principal, who reports to the director.

Admissions 
Dalat still serves its purpose of educating "TCKs" and the North American expatriate community but has since opened its doors to students of all faiths and nationalities who meet the admissions criteria. Priority for financial aid is still given to students whose parents work for Christian organizations.

Curriculum 
Dalat International School uses the United States standards of education, "McREL Compendium of Standards and Benchmarks". Dalat also uses Expected School-wide Learning Results (ESLRs), teaching methods that focus on cooperative learning and activity-based content learning.

As a Christian school, Dalat requires students to take Bible classes and attend chapel. Chapel services are held weekly and special events each year include Spiritual Emphasis Week and Missions Emphasis Week.

Advanced Placement (AP) courses are offered for students wishing to earn college credit. AP English Language, AP English Literature, AP Modern World History, AP Calculus AB and Calculus BC, AP Computer Science and Principles, AP Physics, AP Biology, AP Mandarin, AP Art Studio, and AP Music Theory are offered, while other AP courses are made available through distance learning.

References

External links

 Dalat International School

International schools in Malaysia
American international schools in Asia
Educational institutions established in 1929
Schools accredited by the Western Association of Schools and Colleges
Nondenominational Christian schools
1929 establishments in British Malaya
Malaysia–United States relations
Schools in Penang